Victor Abel Verschueren (born 19 April 1893, date of death unknown) was a Belgian bobsledder and ice hockey player who competed during the early 1920s.

At the 1924 Winter Olympics in Chamonix he won a bronze medal in the four-man bobsleigh event. He was also a member of the Belgian ice hockey team which was eliminated in the first round of the 1924 Olympic tournament.

References
Victor Verschueren's profile at Sports Reference.com
Bobsleigh four-man Olympic medalists for 1924, 1932–56, and since 1964
Wallenchinsky, David. (1984). "Bobsled: Four-Man". In The Complete Book the Olympics: 1896-1980. New York: Penguin Books. p. 559.

External links
 

1893 births
Year of death missing
Belgian male bobsledders
Belgian ice hockey goaltenders
Bobsledders at the 1924 Winter Olympics
Ice hockey players at the 1924 Winter Olympics
Medalists at the 1924 Winter Olympics
Olympic bobsledders of Belgium
Olympic bronze medalists for Belgium
Olympic ice hockey players of Belgium
Olympic medalists in bobsleigh